2021 in Bellator MMA was the thirteenth year in the history of Bellator MMA, a mixed martial arts promotion based in the United States. Bellator held 18 events in 2021.

Background
The promotion went on a hiatus following Bellator 254 on December 10, 2020, which would be the final card to air on CBS Sports Network. Beginning in April, all Bellator cards will air exclusively on the premium Showtime network. Bellator 255, taking place on April 2, 2021, will be the promotion's debut on Showtime and the first MMA card to air on the network in over eight years; the last event being Strikeforce: Marquardt vs. Saffiedine on January 12, 2013.

Events list

Past events

Bellator Featherweight World Grand Prix Tournament

Bellator Light Heavyweight World Grand Prix Tournament

Title fights

See also 
 List of Bellator events
 List of current Bellator fighters
 Bellator MMA Rankings

References

External links
Bellator

2021 in mixed martial arts
Bellator MMA events